This is a list of notable submarine sandwich restaurants. A submarine sandwich, also known as a sub, wedge, hoagie, gyro, grinder, baguette, or one of many regional naming variations, is a sandwich that consists of a long roll of Italian or French bread, split widthwise either into two pieces or opened in a "V" on one side, and filled with a variety of meats, cheeses, vegetables, seasonings, and sauces. The sandwich has no standardized name, and many U.S. regions have their own names for it.

Submarine sandwich restaurants
 

 Amato's
 Arby’s
 Big Bite Submarines 
 Big John Steak & Onion 
 Blimpie
 Campo's
 Capriotti's
 Charleys Philly Steaks  
 Cousins Subs  
 Dalessandro's Steaks
 D'Angelo Sandwich Shops
 DiBella's
 Donkey's Place
 Eegee's
 Erbert and Gerbert's
 Earl of Sandwich (restaurant)
 Firehouse Subs 
 Jerry's Subs & Pizza
 Jimmy John's
 Jersey Mike's 
 Larry's Giant Subs
 Lenny's Sub Shop
 Max's Steaks
 Milio's Sandwiches 
 Moe's Italian Sandwiches
 Mr. Sub
 Penn Station
 Pickleman's Gourmet Cafe 
 Planet Sub 
 Port of Subs 
 Potbelly Sandwich Works 
 Primo Hoagies
  Publix Supermarket
 Quiznos
 Schlotzsky's
 Submarina
 Subway
 Togo's
 Tubby's
 Wawa (company)
 Which Wich?
 White House Sub Shop

See also

 List of delicatessens
 List of restaurant chains
 Lists of restaurants
 List of sandwiches
 List of American sandwiches

References

External links
 

 
Lists of restaurants
American sandwiches